Hachakand may refer to:
 Hachakand-e Darmanlu
 Hachakand-e Tazeh